The Yulee area (also known as the Yulee–Mallory–Reid dormitory complex) is a historic residence hall complex at 13th Street and Inner Road, SW, on the University of Florida campus in Gainesville, Florida in the United States. It is the site of the first permanent dormitories built for women after the campus became co-educational in 1947. On June 24, 2008, it was added to the National Register of Historic Places.

History
Built in 1950, the four story Mallory, Reid and Yulee halls were designed by Florida Board of Control architect Guy Fulton in a simple, contemporary style in keeping with the board's mandate  not to use the more expensive Collegiate Gothic architectural style that had prevailed on campus since its creation in 1905. Fulton, though, did manage to unify the new buildings with the older ones by using the same basic materials of "clay roof tiles, redbrick and stone or concrete trim." Mallory was named for Angela Mallory, wife of U.S. Senator and Confederate cabinet member Stephen Mallory, Reid was named for Mary Martha Reid, a prominent Confederate nurse during the American Civil War, and Yulee was named for Nancy Wycliffe Yulee, daughter of Kentucky Governor and U.S. Postmaster General Charles A. Wickliffe and wife of U.S. Senator David Levy Yulee. These were the first UF buildings to be named for women, albeit in two cases for women whose prominence was based mainly on that of their fathers or husbands.

Yulee Hall
Yulee Hall, the flagship dormitory of the area, contains 94 rooms in single, double and triple style and can house 177 students. It is co-ed by floor. The Yulee area office is located on the first floor of the dorm.

Global Living Learning Community
The hall is home to the Global Living Learning Community, a program designed to teach residents cultural awareness and keep them in touch with current global events while preparing them to be world leaders.

Mallory Hall
Mallory Hall contains 91 rooms in single, double and triple style and can hold 175 students. It was the last remaining women-only hall until fall of 2004 when it became co-ed by floor.

Reid Hall
Reid Hall contains 86 rooms in single, double and triple style and can house 166 students. It is co-ed by floor.

Fine Arts Living Learning Community
Located across Inner Road from the College of Fine Arts, Reid is also home to the Fine Arts Living Learning Community, a program designed to nurture students in the visual and performing arts programs.

See also
University of Florida
Buildings at the University of Florida
University of Florida student housing

References

National Register of Historic Places in Gainesville, Florida
Buildings at the University of Florida
Guy Fulton buildings
Residential buildings completed in 1950
School buildings completed in 1950
Residential buildings on the National Register of Historic Places in Florida
School buildings on the National Register of Historic Places in Florida
History of women in Florida